Harouna Lago (born 1946) is a former Nigerien featherweight boxer. Lago competed at the 1972 Summer Olympics for Niger. He lost his only match to eventual gold medal winner Boris Kuznetsov of the Soviet Union.

1972 Olympic results
Below is the record of Harouna Lago, a Nigerien featherweight boxer who competed at the 1972 Munich Olympics:

 Round of 64: lost to Boris Kuznetsov (Soviet Union) by a first-round knockout

References

1946 births
Living people
Nigerien male boxers
Olympic boxers of Niger
Featherweight boxers
Boxers at the 1972 Summer Olympics